Hubert Fichte (21 March 1935, Perleberg, Province of Brandenburg – 8 March 1986) was a German novelist.

Life 
Hubert Fichte was born on 21 March 1935 in Perleberg Hospital. A few weeks after his birth his family moved to Hamburg-Lokstedt. Fichte's mother worked as stenographer and he was mostly raised by his grandmother. His father, a Jewish merchant, emigrated to Sweden and Fichte never met him. His parents were not married. As a child Fichte was made to believe he was a half-orphan. He received an education as an actor and as a farmer. In the late fifties he worked in Montjustin, not far from Forcalquier in Provence, as a shepherd for several months at painter Serge Fiorio. From 1961 on he lived in Hamburg.

In the mid-1960s, Fichte published his first novels. He then had a regular column called Plattenragout (record ragout) in the magazine konkret. In 1966 he criticised the German police's work in those days in an article called "the police – your friend and aide":  "Shall the baton displace arguments, humour, understanding from the side of the police in this young democracy, burdened with an evil mortgage?" (konkret, Nr. 8). His main influences were Marcel Proust, Hans Henny Jahnn and Jean Genet. With Genet he did a famous interview. He first met Jahnn in 1949 and Jahnn helped Fichte reveal his homosexuality. Fichte described their friendship in his novel Versuch über die Pubertät (Attempt about the puberty) in 1974.

In the 1970s, Fichte devoted himself increasingly to ethnological research. From 1971 to 1975 he travelled to Bahia (Brazil), Haiti and Trinidad several times. He later described the works based on this travels, like Xango (1976) and Petersilie, (1980) as "Ethnopoesie". With them he created his very own technique of combining science and poetry. A sort of "domestic ethnology" was done with his St. Pauli interviews like in Wolli Indienfahrer (St. Pauli is a famous low income and subculture district in Hamburg). Fichte's cohabitee (since 1961) Leonore Mau published her photograph volumes Xango and Petersilie at the same time.

In the late sixties, Fichte began writing his main work Die Geschichte der Empfindlichkeit (the history of the sensibility, or: the story of the pettishness) a monumental cycle of novels. His last set of plans showed his intention to write nineteen books, most of them novels, but also some volumes of essays, called “Glossen”. For these “Glossen” he wanted to compile and rewrite much of his journalistic work like radio features, news paper articles and interviews. The novels describe the life of the homosexual writer “Jäcki” and his cohabitee “Irma”, an older woman and photographer. Fichte could not finish the whole cycle. The existing parts were published after his death. They contain 6 complete novels, 2 fragments of novels, 4 “Glossen”-volumes and 5 supplement volumes. The latter contain interviews, articles and features he wanted to use for “Glossen” books, but could not revise them. At least three more novels he had planned are completely missing.

Fichte died of AIDS-related illness in 1986. Since 1995 the city of Hamburg has awarded the Hubert Fichte Prize for extraordinary literary works.

Awards 
1963 Julius Campe Stipend
1965 Hermann-Hesse-Literaturpreis
1967 Stipend of the Villa Massimo (Rome)
1985 Alexander Zinn Prize
Minor planet 3475 Fichte is named after him.

Selected works 
 Der Aufbruch nach Turku (The departure for Turku, novellas) Hoffmann & Campe, Hamburg 1963
 Im Tiefstall (In the low barn, novella) Galerie im Centre, Göttingen 1965
 Das Waisenhaus (The orphanage, novel) Rowohlt, Reinbek 1965
 Die Palette (The palette, novel) Rowohlt, Reinbek 1968
 Detlevs Imitationen »Grünspan« (Detlevs imitations »verdigris«, novel) Rowohlt, Reinbek 1971
 Versuch über die Pubertät (Attempt about the puberty, novel) Hoffmann & Campe, Hamburg 1974
 Xango. Die afroamerikanischen Religionen II. Bahia. Haiti. Trinidad (Xango. The afroamerican religions II) Fischer, Frankfurt 1976
 Wolli Indienfahrer (Wolli, traveler to India) Fischer, Frankfurt a.M. 1978
 Petersilie. Die afroamerikanischen Religionen IV. Santo Domingo. Venezuela. Miami. Grenada (Parsley. The afroamerican religions IV) Fischer, Frankfurt 1980
 Psyche. Anmerkungen zur Psychiatrie in Senegal (Psyche. Remarks on the psychiatry in Senegal) Qumran, Frankfurt 1980
 Zwei Autos für den Heiligen Pedro Claver (Two cars for the holy Pedro Claver) Qumran, Frankfurt 1982
 Lazarus und die Waschmaschine. Kleine Einführung in die Afroamerikanische Kultur (Lazarus and the washing machine. Small introduction to the afroamerican culture) Fischer, Frankfurt 1985
 Die Geschichte der Empfindlichkeit (The History of the sensibility / The story of the pettishness) Fischer, Frankfurt 1987ff.
 Ödipus auf Håknäss (Oedipus on Håknäss, drama) Fischer, Frankfurt 1992
 St. Pauli Geschichte (St. Pauli story) Berlin (Transit) Berlin 2006
 Ketzerische Bemerkungen für eine neue Wissenschaft vom Menschen (Heretical comments for a new science on mankind) Hamburg (EVA) 2001

References 
 Bandel, Jan-Frederik: Nachwörter. Zum poetischen Verfahren Hubert Fichtes. (Hubert Fichte Studien Bd. 8). Aachen, Rimbaud 2008.
 Beckermann, Thomas (Hrsg.): Hubert Fichte – Materialien zu Leben und Werk. Frankfurt/M., Fischer 1985.
 Böhme, Hartmut / Tiling, Nikolaus (Hrsg.): Leben, um eine Form der Darstellung zu erreichen. Studien zum Werk Hubert Fichtes. Frankfurt/M., Fischer 1991.
 Braun, Peter / Weinberg, Manfred: Ethno/Graphie. Reiseformen des Wissens. Tübingen, Gunter Narr 2002.
 Carp, Ulrich: Rio Bahia Amazonas. Untersuchungen zu Hubert Fichtes Roman der Ethnologie mit einer lexikalischen Zusammenstellung zur Erforschung der Religionen Brasiliens. Würzburg, Königshausen & Neumann 2002.
 Fisch, Michael: Explosion der Forschung. Bibliografie zu Leben und Werk von Hubert Fichte. Unter Berücksichtigung des Werkes von Leonore Mau. (Bibliografie zur deutschen Literatur Bd. 16). Bielefeld: Aisthesis 2007.
 Heinrichs, Hans-Jürgen: Die Djemma el-Fna geht durch mich hindurch. Oder wie sich Poesie, Ethnologie und Politik durchdringen. Hubert Fichte und sein Werk. Bielefeld, Pendragon 1991.
 Kammer, Stephan / Krauthausen, Karin (Ed.): Hubert Fichtes Medien. Zurich and Berlin, Diaphanes 2014
 Röhr, Sabine: Hubert Fichte. Poetische Erkenntnis. Montage – Synkretismus – Mimesis. Göttingen, Herodot 1985.
 Seifert-Waibel, Miriam: „Ein Bild aus tausend widersprüchlichen Fitzeln“. Die Rolle der Collage in Hubert Fichtes Explosion und Das Haus der Mina in São Luiz de Maranhão. Bielefeld, Aisthesis 2005.
 Teichert, Torsten: “Herzschlag außen”. Die poetische Konstruktion des Fremden und Eigenen im Werk von Hubert Fichte. Frankfurt/M., Fischer 1987.
 Tiling, Johann Nikolaus: Hauchbilder der Erinnerung. Biographische Spuren und die Entwicklung literarischer Motive im Werk Hubert Fichtes. Berlin, rosa winkel 1996.
 von Wangenheim, Wolfgang: Hubert Fichte. München, edition text + kritik (Autorenbücher) 1980.

Films about Hubert Fichte 
 Hubert Fichte – der schwarze Engel (Hubert Fichte: The Black Angel), 2005 documentary. Running time 60 minutes.
 Palette revisited, 2005 documentary. Running time 67 minutes.

Footnotes

External links 
An article about the relationship of Hubert Fichte and Leonore Mau (in German)
An article by Ulrich Peltzer about Fichte's combination of poetry and ethnology
Fichte's biography (in German)
www.hubertfichte.de, a website in German written and maintained by Bandel, a Fichte biographer

1935 births
1986 deaths
20th-century German male writers
20th-century German novelists
20th-century German LGBT people
German gay writers
German male novelists
German people of Jewish descent
LGBT Jews
German LGBT novelists
People from Perleberg
People from the Province of Brandenburg
Writers from Brandenburg